Liam Bowen is an American college baseball coach and former player, who is the current head baseball coach of the UMBC Retrievers.

Playing career
Bowen attended Montgomery Blair High School in Silver Spring, Maryland. Upon graduation, Bowen enrolled at Macalester College in St. Paul, Minnesota. Bowen pitched 4 seasons for the Scots.

As a freshman in 2003, Bowen made 4 relief appearances pitching 3.1 innings and striking out 2 batters.

In 2004 as a sophomore, Bowen took on the ace role of the team's pitching staff. He led the team with 3 wins with a team low 4.19 ERA. He also led the team with 49 strikeouts.

As a junior in 2005, Bowen pitched a team-high 59 innings, 11 starts, 4 complete games and 43 strikeouts.

In 2006, Bowen went 6–2 with a 5.18 ERA.

Coaching career
Upon graduation, Bowen accepted a position at St. Mary's College of Maryland as a pitching coach. He was at St. Mary's for 4 years, dropping the team ERA by 3 runs during his tenure. In 2011, Bowen became a graduate assistant at Lincoln Memorial University.

On September 7, 2011, Bowen was named a volunteer assistant coach for the UMBC Retrievers baseball team. On May 1, 2019, Bowen was named the interim head coach for the Retrievers when Bob Mumma resigned.

On May 22, 2019, Bowen was promoted to head coach of the Retrievers.

Head coaching record

References

External links
Macalester Scots bio
UMBC Retrievers bio

Living people
Year of birth missing (living people)
Macalester Scots baseball players
St. Mary's Seahawks baseball coaches
Lincoln Memorial Railsplitters baseball coaches
UMBC Retrievers baseball coaches